Veronica Gentili (born 9 July 1982) is an Italian journalist, television presenter and actress.

Biography 
Gentili was born in Rome on 9 July 1982. She is the daughter of painter Netta Vespignani, the former wife of painter Renzo Vespignani. In 2006, she graduated from Accademia Nazionale di Arte Drammatica Silvio D'Amico and began working in film, television and theatre. She made her debut as an actress in 1999 in Gabriele Muccino's film Come te nessuno mai. In 2015, she became a freelance journalist but already began to have notoriety starting from 2013 as a guest of Piazzapulita on La7. In 2016, she started writing for Fatto Quotidiano and became a regular guest of La Gabbia, L'Aria Che Tira and Coffee break which broadcast on La7. In 2018, she became co-host of the Stasera Italia program broadcast on Rete 4, as well as commenting on the Italian political elections. Every weekend she presents on Rete 4 on the Stasera Italia Weekend program, while during the summer, presents on Stasera Italia Estate every day.

References 

1982 births
Living people
Italian television journalists
Italian actresses